Black Hippy is an American hip hop supergroup from South Los Angeles, California, formed in 2008. The group is composed of West Coast rappers Ab-Soul, Jay Rock, Kendrick Lamar and ScHoolboy Q. Black Hippy was constructed after all of its members had signed to Carson-based indie record label, Top Dawg Entertainment (TDE).

Although the collective currently has no albums together, the members are frequent collaborators, regularly appearing and contributing to each other's respective solo projects, oftentimes not even crediting one another as a guest vocalist or featured artist. Lamar has stated that the group would never face demise due to the solidification of each member's career.

History

Formation and career beginnings (2008–11)
The group was formed in 2008, when all of its members were signed to Top Dawg Entertainment, a Carson-based independent record label. The idea of forming a group came from Schoolboy Q, who said he was "slacking in [his] music": "I figured if I could be in a group I could just write one verse and I could be good", he added. Schoolboy Q, the last of the four to join the label, admitted to initially being intimidated when he first started going to the studio, but eventually the tenacity of his collaborators rubbed off on him. In 2011, Black Hippy received co-signs from West Coast hip hop legends Dr. Dre and Snoop Dogg, as well as Tech N9ne who called them "the new N.W.A", and had hopes of signing the group to his Strange Music imprint.

Solo albums (2012–present) 
In March 2012, MTV announced that Kendrick Lamar closed a joint venture deal with Interscope Records and Aftermath Entertainment. Under the new deal, it was announced Lamar's major label debut album, Good Kid, M.A.A.D City (2012), would be jointly released via Aftermath, Top Dawg and Interscope. On August 9, 2012 the music video for Ab-Soul's "Black Lip Bastard (Remix)", which features the rest of Black Hippy, was released. In the summer of 2012, the group performed at the annual hip hop festival Rock the Bells. In late 2012, the group collaborated once again to remix Lamar's singles "The Recipe" and "Swimming Pools", which were included on Good Kid, M.A.A.D City. On December 20, 2012, the lineup for the 2013 Paid Dues hip hop festival was revealed, announcing Black Hippy as the headliners.

In March 2013, Black Hippy became the first hip hop group to have all members make XXL's annual Top 10 Freshmen list; with Jay Rock appearing on the 2010 issue, Kendrick Lamar on the 2011 issue and Ab-Soul, alongside Schoolboy Q, on the 2013 issue. In April 2013, Black Hippy covered RESPECT. magazine, which hit newsstands on the 30th. Also in April 2013, it was reported that Kendrick Lamar added dates to his good kid m.A.A.d city concert tour, revealing his upcoming US dates will feature all four members of the Black Hippy crew. On May 23, 2013, in anticipation of their tour together, Black Hippy released a remix to Atlanta-based rapper Rocko's 2013 single "U.O.E.N.O.".

Following the highly acclaimed TDE cypher at the 2013 BET Hip Hop Awards, which featured Black Hippy rapping alongside their TDE label-mate Isaiah Rashad, the group appeared on the cover of the October/November issue of XXL. In December 2013, Black Hippy performed at Power 106 and Footaction's 2013 Cali Christmas event. During a February 2014 interview with Lamar, Schoolboy Q, Anthony "Top Dawg" Tiffith and Dave Free, there was talk of a debut effort from the Black Hippy collective, to possibly have been released during 2014.

On March 16, 2015, Lamar released his second major-label album, To Pimp a Butterfly, which received rave reviews from music critics. In June 2015, Ab-Soul, Jay Rock and Schoolboy Q, appeared alongside Lamar, in the beginning of his music video for "Alright", To Pimp a Butterflys fourth single. On September 11, 2015, Jay Rock released his long-awaited second album, 90059. The album features the first Black Hippy posse cut since 2013, titled "Vice City". Separate from Schoolboy Q’s 2016 release entitled Blank Face LP, Schoolboy Q’s single featuring Kanye West, "That Part" was remixed by Black Hippy, released July 6, 2016.

Discography

Singles 
As featured artist

Guest appearances
Album appearances together

Filmography 
Music videos

See also

 Top Dawg Entertainment discography
 Ab-Soul discography
 Jay Rock discography
 Kendrick Lamar discography
 Schoolboy Q discography
 West Coast hip hop
 List of West Coast hip hop artists
 List of musical supergroups

References

External links 
 
 
 

African-American musical groups
Hip hop groups from California
Hip hop collectives
Musical groups established in 2009
Musical groups from Los Angeles
Musical quartets
Top Dawg Entertainment artists
Hip hop supergroups
Kendrick Lamar
2009 establishments in California